The 2023 Big Ten baseball tournament will be held at Charles Schwab Field Omaha in Omaha, Nebraska, from May 24 through 28. The tournament will air on the Big Ten Network.

Format and seeding
The 2023 tournament will be an eight team double-elimination tournament. The top eight teams based on conference regular season winning percentage earn invites to the tournament. The teams will then play a double-elimination tournament leading to a single championship game.

Bracket

References

Tournament
Big Ten Baseball Tournament
Big Ten baseball tournament